Dūkštas Manor is a former residential manor in Dūkšteliai village, Ignalina District Municipality, Lithuania. Reconstruction works of the manor began in 2005; however, it was stuck until 2010 when it was continued.

References

Manor houses in Lithuania
Classicism architecture in Lithuania